Big Brother Україна is a Ukrainian version of the Big Brother reality television show based on the Dutch television series of the same name originally created in 1997 by John de Mol's company Endemol. The show is based on a group of strangers, known as Housemates, living together twenty-four hours a day in the "Big Brother" house, isolated from the outside world but under constant surveillance with no privacy for five months more.

The housemates compete by avoiding weekly eviction until the last housemates remain at the end of the season that can claim the grand prize. The show hosted by television personality Olha Horbachova and Oleksiy Kurban and broadcast on K1. The first and only season premiered on Monday 18 September 2011 and finished on Sunday 25 December 2011. The winner was Kristina Kotvickaja.

Housemates

Nominations table

Audiences

References

External links
http://big-brother.com.ua/

2011 Ukrainian television series debuts
Ukraine
2010s Ukrainian television series endings
Ukraine (TV channel) original programming